The following outline is provided as an overview of and topical guide to birds:

Birds (class Aves) – winged, bipedal, endothermic (warm-blooded), egg-laying, vertebrate animals. There are around 10,000 living species, making them the most varied of tetrapod vertebrates. They inhabit ecosystems across the globe, from the Arctic, to the Antarctic. Extant birds range in size from the  bee hummingbird to the  ostrich.

What type of thing is a bird 
A bird can be described as all of the following:
 Life form – entity or being that is living or alive.
 Animal – multicellular, eukaryotic organisms of the kingdom Animalia (also called Metazoa). Their body plan eventually becomes fixed as they develop, although some undergo a process of metamorphosis later on in their lives. Most animals are motile, meaning they can move spontaneously and independently.

Biological classification 

 Kingdom: Animalia
 Phylum: Chordata
 Class: Aves

Nature of birds 

Bird

Bird anatomy 

Bird anatomy
List of terms used in bird topography
Beak
Caruncle
Comb
Feathers
Alula
Barb (feather)
Barbule
Covert (feather)
Crest (feathers)
Down feather
Ear tuft
Feather holes
Feather-plucking
Flight feather
Pennaceous feather
Pin feather
Plumage
Quill
Speculum feather
Gape
Gizzard
Preen gland
Syrinx
Vision
Nictitating membrane
Pecten oculi
Uropygial gland
Wattle

Bird behavior 

Bird behavior
Bird colony
Feeding
Feeding of birds
Food plants
Gleaning (birds)
Hawking
Hoarding
Pellet (ornithology)
Plucking post
Flight
Flightless birds
Flocking
Migration
Flyway
Atlantic Flyway
Central Flyway
Central Asian Flyway
East Asian - Australasian Flyway
East Atlantic Flyway
Mississippi Flyway
Pacific Flyway
West Pacific Flyway
Pigeon intelligence
Abnormal behaviour of birds in captivity
Aggression
Anting (bird activity)
Begging behavior in birds
Distraction display
Dust bathing
Feather-plucking
Fecal sac
Intelligence
Mobbing
Moult
Preening
Reproduction
Avian incubation
Bird-nesting
Brood parasite
Clutch (eggs)
Egg
Egg tossing
Fledgling
Homosexual behavior in birds
List of birds displaying homosexual behavior
Sexual behaviour
Nest
Altricial
Nest box
Precocial
Siblicide
Roosting
Communal roosting
Tracks
Vocalization

Types of birds

Orders

Families

Subfamilies

Genera

History of birds 

 Bird evolution
Origin of birds
Origin of avian flight
Archaeopteryx
Extinct birds

Study of birds 

Avian ecology field methods
Bird census
Breeding bird survey
Christmas Bird Count
Bird collections
Bird feeding
Bird feeder
Bird food
Mealworm
Niger
Safflower
Suet
Sunflower seed
Bird ichnology
Bird tracks
Bird observatory
Bird ringing
Cannon net
Mist net
Bird watching
Bird hide
Field guide
Field mark
List of birdwatchers
List of birding books
Seawatching
List of seawatching locations by country
Oology
Jourdain Society
Palaeooölogy

Aviculture 

Aviculture
Falconry
Day-old cockerel
Falconry (training)
Lure (falconry)
Takagari
Pigeon racing
Pinioning
War pigeon
Cher Ami
Commando (pigeon)
G. I. Joe (pigeon)
Paddy (pigeon)
William of Orange (pigeon)
Wing clipping

Bird diseases and parasites 
 
Aspergillosis
Avian influenza
Avian malaria
Bird louse
Feather mite
Psittacosis

Threats and conservation 
Avicide
Bird conservation
Bird sanctuary
Bird conservation groups
Bird Protection Quebec
BirdLife International
Fundación ProAves
National Audubon Society
Royal Society for the Protection of Birds
Important bird areas
Bird control
Bird control spike
Bird netting
Bird scarer
Goose egg addling
Scarecrow
Bird strike
Towerkill

Persons influential in the field of birds

Artists 

Lars Jonsson
David Allen Sibley

Ornithologists 

List of ornithologists
John Gould
James Clements
James Audubon
Chris Mead
Killian Mullarney
Roger Tory Peterson
Pamela C. Rasmussen
Alexander Skutch
David Snow
Alexander Wilson

Writers 
Mark Cocker
Pete Dunne

Birds in culture 
Featherwork
Quill

See also 

Dinosaur
Outline of dinosaurs

References

External links 

 
Birds
Birds